Veritas was a West German post World War II sports and race car company, located in the village of Hausen am Andelsbach, near Sigmaringen, Baden-Württemberg. It later moved to Meßkirch and Muggensturm and finally to the Nürburgring.

The company was founded by Ernst Loof, Georg Meier and Lorenz Dietrich who initially re-built and tuned pre-war BMW 328 cars using components supplied by the customer, turning them into BMW-Veritas cars. The first car was used in 1947 Karl Kling to win at Hockenheim and subsequently become the 1947 German 2-litre champion. After only a few cars were made, following an objection from BMW, the cars became simply known as Veritas.

Road cars
The first Veritas to be made for normal road use were made in 1949 with the launch of the Komet coupé which was little more than a Veritas RS made street legal. It was followed by the more civilised 2+2 Saturn coupé and Scorpion cabriolet, both being styled by Ben Bowden.

The company moved to larger premises in Muggensturm in 1949 but they were badly undercapitalised. New cars were designed using a 1998 cc engine designed Eric Zipprich and built by Heinkel. Over 200 orders were received for the new car but there was not enough money to buy the components and production came to a halt in 1950. The company continued in operation until 1952 by making new bodies for Panhard cars.

Ernst Loof moved to the Nürburgring in 1950 where he rented the old Auto Union workshops and set up a new company Automobilwerke Ernst Loof GmbH and started a new range of Veritas cars with the Heinkel manufactured engine and saloon or cabriolet coachwork by Spohn. Money quickly ran out however and the final bodies were fitted with Ford or Opel engines. The number of cars made at the Nürburgring is estimated to be between 6 and 20.

Racing cars

A total of 17 privately entered Veritas cars participated in 5 FIA World Championship races.

Later production (after 2001)

After a virtual disappearance from motor racing and automotive engineering for nearly 50 years, a small company known as VerMot AG of Grafschaft, Rhineland planned to revive the Veritas name. It produced a concept known as the Veritas RS III in 2001, initially using a BMW sourced 6.0 litre V-12, producing . Over the following years pre-production models of the RS III were exhibited at trade shows and used as press demonstrators. The motor was changed to a 5 litre BMW unit. In 2011 VerMot announced that the RS III would be offered as a hybrid with an additional electric motor, and that a fully electric version was in planning. Various dates from 2008 onwards were announced for the start of production of the RS III, but this appears to have failed to occur and by 2014 the company was dormant.

World Championship results
(key)

References

External links
The Veritas story

Formula One constructors
Sports car manufacturers
German racecar constructors
Formula Two constructors
Defunct motor vehicle manufacturers of Germany